Caledonia Junior High School is a Canadian public school in Dartmouth, Nova Scotia. It is operated by the Halifax Regional School Board (HRSB).

Caledonia Junior High offers the grade 7 late entry French immersion program.  After grade 9 students will continue their studies at Prince Andrew High School, or at Dartmouth High School if they wish to continue Late French Immersion.

The school takes students from Ian Forsyth Elementary School, Michael Wallace Elementary School and Admiral Westphal Elementary School.

External links
School profile at Halifax Regional School Board

Middle schools in Nova Scotia
Educational institutions established in 1963
Schools in Halifax, Nova Scotia
1963 establishments in Nova Scotia